Disintegrate is the third and final studio album by Norwegian blackened death metal band Zyklon. It was released on 15 May 2006. Clocking at 45:06, Disintegrate is Zyklon's longest album. It was recorded from November to December 2005 at the "Akkerhaugen Lydstudio" in Norway.

Track listing 
All music written and arranged by Zyklon; all lyrics written by Bard "Faust" Eithun.

Personnel

Zyklon 
 Secthdamon – vocals, bass guitar
 Destructhor – lead guitar, backing vocals
 Samoth – rhythm guitar
 Trym – drums

Additional musicians 
Keyboard arrangements and programming by Thorbjørn Akkerhaugen and Zyklon.
Additional keyboard arrangement and programming on "Skinned and Endangered" by Cosmo and Miza[R] @ Mordisco Recordings

Production 
Produced by Zyklon, Thorbjørn Akkerhaugen and Patrik J. Sten
Recorded at Akkerhaugen Lydstudio, Norway, November and December 2005
Engineered by Thorbjørn Akkerhaugen,
Mixed at Studio Fredman, Sweden, by Patrik J and Fredrik Nordström, February 2006
Mastered at Tailor Maid by Peter In de Betou

References 

2003 albums
Zyklon albums